Norm Coleman (born 1949) is a former U.S. Senator from Minnesota from 2003 to 2009. Senator Coleman may also refer to:

Creighton R. Coleman (1912–1992), Michigan State Senate
Eric D. Coleman (born 1951), Connecticut State Senate
John C. Coleman (1823–1919), California State Senate
Julia Coleman (politician) (born 1991), Minnesota State Senate
Linda Coleman-Madison, Alabama State Senate
Maida Coleman (born 1954), Missouri State Senate
Marshall Coleman (born 1942), Virginia State Senate
Nick Coleman (1925–1981), Minnesota State Senate
Thomas Coleman (New York politician) (1808–1894), New York State Senate
Tom Coleman (Georgia politician) (1928–2014), Georgia State Senate
William D. Coleman (politician) (1842–1908), Liberian Senator

See also
Edward Colman (American politician) (1828–1898), Wisconsin State Senate